Knyazev is a Russian masculine surname, its feminine counterpart is Knyazeva. It may refer to
 Andrei Knyazev (footballer) (born 1974), Russian football player
 Andrei Knyazev (mathematician) (born 1959), Russian-American mathematician
 Andrei Knyazev (musician) (born 1973), Russian rock musician and songwriter
Artem Knyazev (born 1980), Uzbekistani figure skater
Boris Knyazev (1900–1975), Russian ballet dancer and choreographer
Hanna Knyazeva (born 1989), Ukrainian triple jumper and long jumper
Helena Knyazeva (born 1959), Russian philosopher
Igor Knyazev (born 1983), Russian ice hockey defenceman
Ivan Knyazev (born 1992), Russian football defender
Kirill Knyazev (born 1983), Russian ice hockey player
Olga Knyazeva (1954–2015), Soviet fencer
Serhiy Knyazev (born 1971), Chief of Ukrainian National Police
Svetlana Knyazeva (born 1970), Russian equestrian
Valery Knyazev (born 1992), Russian ice hockey player
Vyacheslav Knyazev (born 1974), Tajikistani football player

Russian-language surnames